Wolf Emil Wohlwill (24 November 1835 in Seesen – 2 February 1912 in Hamburg) was a German-Jewish engineer of electrochemistry. He invented the Wohlwill process in 1874.

Literary works 
 Galilei und sein Kampf für die copernikanische Lehre, the 1st volume, 1909
 the 2nd volume, 1926

See also 
 Wohlwill process
 Wohlwill-Andrade syndrome

References
Gold Avenue Encyclopedia

1835 births
1912 deaths
People from Seesen
People from the Duchy of Brunswick
19th-century German Jews
Engineers from Lower Saxony